Drummer's Holiday is an album by American jazz drummer Louie Bellson featuring performances recorded in 1957 for the Verve label.

Reception

AllMusic awarded the album 3 stars.

Track listing
 "Blues for Keeps" - 6:52
 "For Louis's Kicks" - 3:21
 "T-Bones" - 3:14
 "I'm Shooting High" (Jimmy McHugh, Ted Koehler) - 2:45
 "How Many Times?" - 3:00
 "Portofino" 
 "Drummer's Holiday"
 "Limehouse Blues" (Philip Braham, Douglas Furber) 
Recorded in New York City on February 12, 1956 (track 1), May 30, 1956 (tracks 2 & 3) and January 26, 1958 (tracks 4-8)

Personnel
Louie Bellson – drums
Charlie Shavers - trumpet 
Eddie Bert (track 1), Vincent Forchetti (tracks 2 & 3) - trombone
Red Press (tracks 2 & 3), Ernie Wilkins (track 1) - alto saxophone
Eddie Wasserman - tenor saxophone (tracks 2-8)
Ted Lee - baritone saxophone (tracks 1-3)
Hank Jones (tracks 4-8), Nat Pierce (track 1), Lou Stein (tracks 2 & 3) - piano
Ray Brown (tracks 1 & 4-8), George Duvivier (tracks 2 & 3) - bass

References

1958 albums
Louie Bellson albums
Albums produced by Norman Granz
Verve Records albums